Avatha pulcherrima is a species of moth of the family Erebidae. It is found in Sundaland and New Guinea. The habitat consists of lowland forests and lower montane forests.

Larvae have been reared on Pometia and Maniltoa species.

References

Moths described in 1892
Avatha
Moths of Asia
Moths of New Guinea